Martha Denise Munizzi (born February 26, 1968) is an American Christian music singer, songwriter, author, and pastor.

Early years
A native of central Florida, Martha Munizzi was born into a Christian musical family. The daughter of evangelists, Martha and her twin sister Mary Alessi were born in Lakeland, Florida and grew up traveling and ministering through music with her family. She began performing at age 8, touring the country with her family in concerts and crusades around the United States and Canada.

Martha, Mary, and their older sister Marvelyne were born with their parents' talent for music and became a part of the traveling family group as kids. The family settled in Orlando, Florida when Mary and Martha were 12, so that the children could attend formal, public school.

At age 16, Mary, Martha and Marveline (age 18) helped form a praise and worship band at the urging of a church friend. That group evolved into Testament and became popular enough to travel around the state of Florida performing in churches and at conferences and other events.

One year after completing high school (1986), Martha married Dan Munizzi, who was a keyboard and bass player in the band Testament. In 1993 she and Dan became the music directors and founding members of a new, fledgling church in Orlando, Florida initially leading a congregation of 250 and a choir of about 30 people that eventually grew in 8 years into a 5000-member congregation and a 200-member music team.  They remained there until 2001.

She led worship at Lakewood Church while Cindy Cruse-Ratcliff was on maternity leave.

Musical career
Along with figures like Ron Kenoly, CeCe Winans, and Israel Houghton,  Munizzi is pioneering cross-cultural worship music that not only connects with both black and white Christian congregations but also reaches the masses.

Munizzi's songs are self-published under the name Say The Name Publishing/Martha Munizzi Music. She released her first Praise & Worship/Gospel album, Say the Name (2002), followed by The Best Is Yet to Come (2003) and When He Came (2004), both of which debuted high on Billboard's Gospel chart. The Best Is Yet to Come peaked at No. 2 on the Billboard Music Top Gospel Album charts in 2004 and remained on the charts for more than a year.

In 2004, Munizzi had two music albums in the top five on Billboard'''s Gospel charts at the same time (The Best Is Yet to Come at No. 2 and When He Came at No. 5) and Billboard Magazine named her as one of the top five Gospel Artists for 2004. Additionally, her project The Best Is Yet to Come was named one of the top ten selling Gospel projects for 2004.

In 2005, she signed a distribution deal with Integrity Media, Inc. Under this agreement, her previously released albums The Best Is Yet To Come and Say The Name and all future releases were to be distributed to Christian retail outlets through Provident-Integrity Distribution and to general market outlets on the Epic Records (a division of Sony-BMG Distribution).

In 2006, Munizzi released her next CD entitled No Limits Live. This CD debuted on Billboard's Top Gospel Charts at No. 1 and remained at the top of the charts for 6 weeks.

Munizzi has ministered with several popular Christian ministries including; Joel Osteen, Creflo Dollar, Joyce Meyer, Benny Hinn, CeCe Winans, and Bishop T.D. Jakes.  She has also appeared on Trinity Broadcasting Network's (TBN's) Praise The Lord, on the Daystar Television Network, on Life Today with James Robison, and on Black Entertainment Television's BET Celebration Of Gospel. Additionally she performed as a part of the 3rd annual "Sisters In The Spirit" tour with Yolanda Adams, Kelly Price, Juanita Bynum, Rizen and Sheila E in 2005. She was also a featured performer with Kirk Franklin at the "Imagine Me" all-star celebrity benefit concert on January 11, 2007 at the Opryland Hotel in Nashville, Tennessee. The concert was a benefit for the Children's Defense Fund.

Munizzi also performed with the Gospel trio Virtue on their 2006 album Testimony on the song Praises to You. She also performs her song Glorious live on Donna Richardson-Joyner's 2006 exercise video entitled Sweating in the Spirit 2. Her twin sister, Mary Alessi, performs with her on her 2006 album No Limits Live.

The CD/DVD project, Change the World was released on April 1, 2008. The project was recorded on December 7, 2007 and features Israel Houghton, Mary Alessi, Micah Stampley, Bishop Joseph Garlington, and Ricardo Sanchez.

On April 24, 2011, Munizzi released Make it Loud her first self-produced CD. The new project features William McDowell, Michael Gungor, Jonathan Stockstill, Lori Morrison, Daniel Eric Groves, and the debut of Danielle Munizzi, her daughter.

On August 27, 2021, Munizzi released Best Days, with a new single "Fight for Me".

Personal life
Munizzi married Dan Munizzi in 1987 and have three children: Danielle, Nicole, and Nathan. Martha and Dan currently pastor Epic Life Church in Orlando, Florida.

Discography

Awards and nominations
Munizzi has been nominated for Grammy, Dove, Stellar and Soul Train Awards as both a performer and songwriter. In 2006, Munizzi was nominated for a Grammy for Best Traditional Soul Gospel Album. She has also been nominated for the 2007 Stellar Awards' Artist of the Year and Contemporary Female Vocalist of the Year''.

External links
Martha Munizzi - Official Website
Cross Rhythms Artist Profile - Martha Munizzi
Christianity Today Artist Profile and Interview - Martha Munizzi
Martha Munizzi - Interview (September 2008) on BlackGospel.com

References

1968 births
Living people
20th-century American singers
20th-century American women singers
21st-century American singers
21st-century American women singers
Actresses from Orlando, Florida
American gospel singers
American women singer-songwriters
Musicians from Lakeland, Florida
Musicians from Orlando, Florida
Religious leaders from Florida
Singer-songwriters from Florida
Urban contemporary gospel musicians
Writers from Orlando, Florida